Smołdzino  (German Schmolsin) is a village in Słupsk County, Pomeranian Voivodeship, in northern Poland. It is the seat of the gmina (administrative district) called Gmina Smołdzino.

Before 1945 the area of Farther Pomerania, where the village is located,  was a part of Germany. On March 8, 1945, the region was conquested by the Red Army, and after the end of World War II the local populace was expelled to West Germany and the town and district became part of Poland as Powiat słupski. For the history of the region, see History of Pomerania.

Michael Brüggemann lived in the town.

The village has a population of 984.

References

Villages in Słupsk County